Army is the newspaper published by the Australian Army. The paper is produced fortnightly and is uploaded online so that members can access it when deployed overseas.

See also 
Navy News (Australia)
Air Force (newspaper)
Table Tops, a free daily newspaper produced for Australian Army personnel during WWII, with regional editions produced abroad, for serving personnel

External links 
Official Site

Australian Army
Military newspapers published in Australia